Yuliy is a given name. Notable people with the name include:

Yuliy Aykhenval'd or Yuly Aykhenvald (1872–1928), Russian Jewish literary critic who developed a native brand of Aestheticism
Yuliy Daniel or Yuli Daniel (1925–1988), Soviet dissident writer, poet, translator, and political prisoner
Yuliy Dmitrievich Engel (1868–1927), music critic, composer and one of the leading figures in the Jewish art music movement
Yuliy Ganf (1898–1973), Soviet Russian graphic artist, People's Artist of the USSR
Yuliy Kim (born 1936), one of Russia's foremost bards and playwrights
Yuliy Meitus (1903–1997), distinguished Ukrainian composer, famous for his operas
Yuliy Sannikov (born 1978), Ukrainian economist
Yuliy Osipovich Tsederbaum (1873–1923), leader of the Mensheviks in early twentieth century Russia
Yuliy Mikhailovich Vorontsov (1929–2007), Russian diplomat, President of International Centre of the Roerichs (Moscow)

See also
You Lie (disambiguation)
Yue Li